Benóný Ásgrímsson is an Icelandic aviator. He served with the Icelandic Coast Guard for 50 years, including 38 years as a helicopter pilot from 1978 to 2016 where he participated in several high-profile resuce operations.

Coast guard career
He started his career with the Coast Guard at the age of 14 on board the ICGV Ægir but later moved the its helicopter division. In 1986, he participated in the rescue of two survivors of the Ljósufjöll air crash onboard TF-SIF. In 1997, he was the captained TF-LÍF when its crew rescued 29 sailors in two incidents over a four-day period. On 5 March, 19 sailors from the cargo ship  were rescued aboard TF-LÍF after the ship suffered engine failure and ran aground on the south coast of Iceland, east of Þjórsá. One crewmember from  washed overboard during the rescue operations and drowned.

He officially retired from the Coast Guard on his 65th birthday on 30 September 2016.

References

Asgrimsson, Benony
Asgrimsson, Benony
Icelandic aviators